Barry Emanuel Supple, CBE, FBA (born 27 October 1930, Hackney, London), is Emeritus Professor of Economic History, University of Cambridge, and a former Director of the Leverhulme Trust.  He is the father of theatre and opera director Tim Supple.

Education
 Hackney Downs School (where he was a contemporary of Harold Pinter)
 London School of Economics (Honorary Fellow, 2001)
 Christ's College, Cambridge

Career 
 Assistant Professor of Business History, Harvard University, 1955–1960
 Associate Prof. of Economic History, McGill University, 1960–1962
 University of Sussex: Lecturer, Reader, then Professor of Economic and Social History, 1962–1978; Dean, School of Social Sciences, 1965–1968; Pro-Vice-Chancellor (Arts and Social Studies), 1968–1972; Pro-Vice-Chancellor, 1978
 University of Oxford: Reader in Recent Social and Economic History, 1978–1981; Professorial Fellow, Nuffield College, Oxford, 1978–1981
 Professorial Fellow, 1981–1983, Honorary Fellow, 1984, Christ's College, Cambridge
 Master of St. Catharine's College, Cambridge, 1984-1993 (Honorary Fellow, 1993)
 Director, Leverhulme Trust, 1993–2001

Honours and other positions 
 Honorary Fellow, Worcester College, Oxford 1986
 Associate Fellow, Trumbull College, Yale University, 1986
 Chairman, Consultative Committee of Assessment of Performance Unit, Department of Education and Science, 1975–1980
 President, Economic History Society, 1992–1995
 Fellow of the British Academy, 1987; Foreign Secretary, 1995–1999
 CBE, 2000

Selected bibliography
Supple, Barry.  Doors Open.  Cambridge, UK: Asher, 2008.   (Autobiography; described in The Clove's Lines 3.2 [March 2009]: 13.)
Supple, Barry.  "Harold Pinter – Some Memories."  The Clove's Lines: The Newsletter of The Clove Club: The Old Boys of Hackney Downs School 3.2 (March 2009): 6–7.  Print.

Notes

References
 "Barry Emanuel Supple."  Listing in Who's Who 2005.

External links
 Interviewed by Alan Macfarlane 3 July 2010 (video)

1930 births
Living people
British historians
Jewish historians
British Jews
Commanders of the Order of the British Empire
Fellows of the British Academy
People educated at Hackney Downs School
Alumni of the London School of Economics
Masters of St Catharine's College, Cambridge
Academics of the University of Sussex
Honorary Fellows of the London School of Economics
Fellows of Nuffield College, Oxford
Academic staff of McGill University